The first season of The Great American Baking Show, released under the title The Great Holiday Baking Show, premiered on ABC on November 30, 2015 as part of ABC's holiday programming schedule. Six amateur bakers competed in twelve challenges throughout the competition for the title of America's best holiday baker.

This season was hosted by husband and wife duo Nia Vardalos and Ian Gomez. The judging panel consisted of original The Great British Bake Off judge Mary Berry and American pastry chef Johnny Iuzzini. As with the British series, this season was filmed in Welford Park with slight holiday decorative modifications made in the set known as "The Tent".

After four weeks of competition, Lauren Katz was crowned the winner with Nicole Silva and Tim Samson as runners-up.

Bakers

Results summary

Color Key:

Episodes

Episode 1: Cookies
For the first signature bake, the bakers were given two hours to make two unique batches of ten cookies, with one batch having icing. Later in the technical bake, bakers only had one hour to bake sixteen brandy snaps according to Mary Berry's recipe. The final bake of the week called the showstopper required bakers to bake a structured gingerbread with decorative designs and cookies around it within five hours.

Color key:

Episode 2: Cake
Festive holiday bakes continued in the tent as bakers had two hours to create a yule log sponge cake with a sweet filling of their choice. The technical bake was based on the recipe of Johnny Iuzzini's tiramisu cake with ladyfinger crisps. For the final showstopper bake, the bakers created a "Twelve Days of Christmas" fruitcake that revolved around one of the verses from the traditional Christmas carol.

Episode 3: Pastry
In the quarterfinals, the bakers created two batches of breakfast pastries with any holiday flavor of their choosing. The technical tested the skills of the remaining bakers in Mary Berry's Christmas fruit tart. For the final pastry bake, the bakers created a centerpiece made from cream puffs and pastry pieces for a spot in the final three.

Episode 4: Final
The final three begun with the signature bake, a holiday pie, to be baked under two-and-a-half hours. The pie also had to be accompanied with a delectable sauce on the side. In the technical, the bakers baked a candy cane-shaped bread with delicate icing and fruit. The final showstopper of the season lasted five hours, as bakers built up to make a three-dimensional presents cake.

Ratings

References 

1
2015 American television seasons